The Eastern Orthodox Church is the most widespread Christian denomination in Bosnia and Herzegovina and the second most widespread religious group in the country, following Islam and followed in turn by Roman Catholicism. Orthodox Christians in Bosnia and Herzegovina belong to the Serbian Orthodox Church. According to the CIA World Factbook, Orthodox Christians make up 30.7% of the country's population.

History 
The end of the High Middle Ages saw Eastern Orthodoxy firmly establish itself – in the form of the Serbian Orthodox Church – in the east of Herzegovina, namely Zachlumia, following a period of rule by the Kingdom of Serbia. Zachlumia was conquered by Bosnian ban Stephen II Kotromanić in the late 1320s and was henceforth part of the Banate of Bosnia (later kingdom), in which the Roman Catholic Church and the indigenous Bosnian Church vied for supremacy. In this political climate, the Eastern Orthodoxy never seems to have penetrated the medieval Bosnia proper beyond Podrinje.

The Ottoman conquest of the Kingdom of Bosnia in 1463 led to drastic changes in the confessional structure of Bosnia and Herzegovina, with Islam taking root and Orthodox Christianity spreading into Bosnia. Sultan Mehmed the Conqueror vowed to protect Orthodox Christianity and, like all Orthodox churches, the Serbian Orthodox Church enjoyed great support from the Ottoman state. The Ottomans introduced a sizeable Orthodox Christian population into Bosnia proper, including Vlachs from the eastern Balkans. The conversion of the adherents of the Bosnian Church also aided the spread of Eastern Orthodoxy. Later, areas abandoned by Catholics during the Ottoman–Habsburg wars were settled with Muslims and Orthodox Christians. The Ottoman regime consistently favored the Orthodox Church over the Catholic and encouraged conversions of Catholics to Orthodoxy due to political expediency: while the entire Orthodox hierarchy was subjected to the sultan, the Catholics were suspected of conspiring with their brethren outside the Ottoman Empire.

While Bosnian Catholics were only allowed to repair existing sacral objects, a large scale construction of Orthodox monasteries and churches throughout Bosnia started in the northwest in 1515. An Orthodox priest was present in Sarajevo already in 1489, and the city's first Orthodox church was constructed between 1520 and 1539. By 1532, Bosnian Orthodox Christians had their own metropolitan bishop, who took up official residence in Sarajevo in 1699. By the end of the 18th century, the Metropolitan of Bosnia had authority over the Orthodox bishops of Mostar, Zvornik, Novi Pazar and Sarajevo. Even the high-ranking Orthodox clergymen, however, were very poorly educated and corrupt; they were reportedly ignorant of the basic principles of the faith, such as the Ten Commandments, confession, prayers and the importance of the cross. Syncretism was widespread among the Bosnians, with Catholics (as late as the 1880s) and Muslims celebrating the Orthodox slava.

The tide eventually turned against the church, however, when Orthodox clergy renounced loyalty to the sultans and started encouraging and aiding peasant rebellions. The Ottomans abolished the Serbian Patriarchate of Peć and, from the late 1760s until 1880, the Orthodox in Bosnia and Herzegovina were directly under the Ecumenical Patriarchate of Constantinople. As such it was led by Phanariotes, Greeks from Istanbul. In the mid-19th century, there were more than 400 Orthodox priests in Bosnia and Herzegovina; it was a time of renewed prosperity for the country's Eastern Orthodoxy. In 1920, following the First World War and the creation of the Kingdom of Yugoslavia, the area again came under the religious authority of the newly reunited Serbian Orthodox Church, under Patriarch Dimitrije.

Serbian Orthodox Church in Bosnia and Herzegovina
Five eparchies (dioceses) of the Serbian Orthodox Church cover the territory of Bosnia and Herzegovina: 
 Metropolitanate of Dabar and Bosnia, headed by metropolitan Hrizostom Jević, since 2017.
 Eparchy of Zahumlje and Herzegovina, headed by bishop Dimitrije Rađenović, since 2018.
 Eparchy of Zvornik and Tuzla, headed by bishop Fotije Sladojević, since 2017.
 Eparchy of Banja Luka, headed by bishop Jefrem Milutinović, since 1980.
 Eparchy of Bihać and Petrovac, headed by bishop Sergije Karanović, since 2017.

Regional Council of Serbian Orthodox Church in Bosnia and Herzegovina consists of all five diocesan bishops. The Council is presided by the Metropolitan of Dabar and Bosnia.

Orthodox Christian sites of interest
Serb Orthodox Cathedral (Sarajevo)
Sarajevo Old Orthodox Church
Church of Sveto Preobraženje
Tavna (monastery)
Tvrdoš (monastery)
Žitomislić (monastery)

References

Bibliography
 
 
 

 
Serbian Orthodox Church in Bosnia and Herzegovina